Franco Alfano (8 March 1875 – 27 October 1954) was an Italian composer and pianist, best known today for his opera Risurrezione (1904) and for having completed Puccini's opera Turandot in 1926. He had considerable success with several of his own works during his lifetime.

Career

Alfano was born in Posillipo, Naples. He attended piano lessons given privately by Alessandro Longo, and harmony and composition respectively under Camillo de Nardis (1857–1951) and Paolo Serrao at the Conservatory San Pietro a Majella in Naples. Later, after graduating, in 1895 he pursued further composition studies with Hans Sitt and Salomon Jadassohn in Leipzig. While working there he met his idol, Edvard Grieg, and wrote numerous piano and orchestral pieces.

From 1918 he was Director of the Conservatory of Bologna, from 1923 Director of the Turin Conservatory, and from 1947 to 1950 Director of the Rossini Conservatory in Pesaro. Alfano died in San Remo.

Operas
Alfano completed his first opera, Miranda (unpublished), for which he also wrote the libretto based on a novel by Antonio Fogazzaro, in 1896. His work La Fonte di Enschir (libretto by Luigi Illica) was refused by Ricordi but was presented in Wrocław (then Breslau) as Die Quelle von Enschir on 8 November 1898. It enjoyed some success.

There followed the opera Risurrezione in 1904. It was based on Tolstoy, and was later sung by Magda Olivero.

Cyrano de Bergerac followed. This based on the famous play by Edmond Rostand and composed to the French libretto by Henri Cain. It had its Italian premiere in Rome in January 1936 and its French premiere in Paris four months later. It was recently revived by the Kiel Opera (Germany), the Montpellier Radio Festival (France) and the Metropolitan Opera, New York City, starring Plácido Domingo in the title role.

In 1921, La Leggenda di Sakùntala appeared, described by some as his most important stage work, and while it was successful enough to have Arturo Toscanini recommend Alfano for the completion of Puccini's posthumous Turandot, the performance materials were thought destroyed in an air raid during the Second World War. Alfano reconstructed it in 1952 as Sakùntala, after Abhijñānaśākuntalam (The Recognition of Sakuntala), the Sanskrit play by Kālidāsa. Subsequently, the original version was recovered in 2005, with the two versions available for performance today. The second version of Sakùntala was performed in New York City by Teatro Grattacielo in the fall of 2013.

Historical perspectives
In Fanfares issue of September/October 1999, it was asserted that Alfano's reputation suffers because of several things. Firstly, that he should not be judged as a composer on the basis of the task he was given in completing Turandot (La Scala, 25 April 1926). Secondly, that we almost never hear everything he wrote for Turandot since the standard ending heavily edits Alfano's work. Thirdly, […] it is not his conclusion that is performed in productions of Turandot but only what the premiere conductor Arturo Toscanini included from it […] Puccini had worked for nine months on the following concluding duet and at his death had left behind a whole ream of sketches […] Alfano had to reconstruct […] according to his best assessment […] and with his imagination and magnifying glass" since Puccini's material "had not really been legible".

"Alfano's reputation has also suffered [IC:along with Mascagni], understandably, because of his willingness to associate himself closely with Mussolini's Fascist government."

Alex Ross, in The New Yorker, notes that a new ending of Turandot composed by Luciano Berio premiered in 2002 is preferred by some critics for making a more satisfactory resolution of Turandot's change of heart, and of being more in keeping with Puccini's evolving technique.

List of works

1896 Miranda Opera
1898 La Fonte di Enschir Opera
1899 Four Romanian Dances for piano
1901 Napoli Ballet
1901 Lorenza - Ballet
1904 Risurrezione Opera 1909 Suite Romantica for orchestra (became Eliana) 
1909 Il principe di Zilah - Opera1910 Symphony n. 1 in E major, Classica 
1910 I Cavalieri e la Bella Opera (never completed) 1914 L'ombra di Don Giovanni Opera (later Don Juan de Manara) 
1918 Tre poemi by Tagore for voice and piano 1918 Quartet n. 1 for strings 
1919 Six songs for voice and piano 1919 Tre Poemi di Tagore for voice and piano 
1921 La Leggenda di Sakùntala Opera 1923 Eliana Ballet from Suite Romantica 
1923 Sonata in D for violin and piano 1925 Sonata for cello and piano 
1926 Turandot finale Opera 1926 Quartet n. 2 for strings 
1927 Madonna Imperia Opera 1928 Tre Liriche di Tagore for voice and piano 
1929 Three Lyrical Poems of Tagore for voice and piano 1930 L'ultimo Lord Opera semiseria, libretto by Ugo Falena 
1930 Himno al Libertador dedicated to Simon Bolivar 1932 Concerto  for Violin, Cello and Piano1933 Vesuvio Ballet 
1933 Symphony n. 2 in C major 1935 Divertimento for piano and chamber orchestra 
1936 Nuove Liriche Tagoriane for voice and piano 1936 Cyrano de Bergerac Opera 
1939 Tre Nuove Liriche 1941 Don Juan de Manara Opera 
1943 E' Giunto il Nostro Ultimo Autunno for voice and piano1945 Quintet in A flat Major for Piano and String Quartet
1947 Sette Liriche for voice and piano1948 Cinque Nuove Liriche Tagoriane for voice and piano 
1949 Il Dottor Antonio Opera 1949 Quartet No 3 in g minor for strings
1950 Vesuvius Opera for radio (from Vesuvius) 1952 Sakùntala Opera (reconstruction now superseded by the original 1921 score, discovered in 2006 in the Ricordi archives)
1953 Sinfonia Classica from Symphony n. 1
Other works:
Suite Adriatica;
Intermezzi for Strings;
Ninna-Nanna Partenopea.

See also List of operas by Franco Alfano.

Recordings
Operas
Cyrano de Bergerac; William Johns, Olivia Stapp, Gianfranco Cecchele, Miti Truccato Pace, Ezio Di Cesare, Alfredo Giacomotti - Director: Maurizio Arena - Orchestra RAI di Torino - Live - 2 CD Opera d'Oro IOD (2004);
Cyrano de Bergerac;Plácido Domingo, Sondra Radvanovsky, Arturo Chacón-Cruz, Rodney Gilfry; Orquestra de la Comunitat Valenciana; conductor Patrick Fournillier; Filmed at the Palau de les Ars 'Reina Sofia', Valencia, 8,11 & 18 February 2007; DVD; EAN 0747313527052
Resurrezione; Magda Olivero, Giuseppe Gismondo, Nucci Condò, Anna Di Stasio - Director: Elio Boncompagni - Live - 2 CD Opera d'Oro IOD (2003);
Sakùntala; Sakùntala: Celestina Casapietra – Il re: Michele Molese – Prijamvada: Laura Didier Gambardella – Anusuya: Adriana Baldiseri – Kanva: Aurio Tomicich – Durvasas: Ferruccio Mazzoli – Harita: Mario Rinaudo – Il giovane eremita: Ezio Di Cesare – Lo scudiero: Carlo Micheluzzi – Un pescatore: Vincenzo Tadeo – Una guardia: Alberto Caruzzi; Orchestra Sinfonica e Coro di Roma della Rai, director: Ottavio Ziino CD Tryphon TRC-9612;
Liriche da Tagore; Duo Alterno: Tiziana Scandaletti, soprano - Riccardo Piacentini, pianoforte CD Nuova Era 7388 (Torino 2004).

Other compositions
Sonata for Cello and Piano, 1925: Samuel Magill (cello); Scott Dunn (piano). CD: Naxos, 2009 (World premiere recording)
Concerto for Violin, Cello and Piano, 1932: Elmira Darvarova (violin); Samuel Magill (cello); Scott Dunn piano. CD: Naxos, 2009 (World premiere recording)
Sonata for Violin and Piano, 1923: Elmira Darvarova (violin); Scott Dunn (piano). CD: Naxos, 2011 (World premiere recording) 
Piano Quintet, 1945: Elmira Darvarova (violin); Mary Ann Mumm (violin); Craig Mumm (viola); Samuel Magill (cello); Scott Dunn (piano). CD, Naxos, 2011 (World premiere recording)

References
Notes

Further reading
 Dryden, Konrad (2010) Franco Alfano: transcending Turandot. Lanham MD: Scarecrow Press 
Posillipo—Leipzig—Miranda (1875–1896) -- La fonte d'enscir (1897–1899) -- Resurrezione and Il principe Zilah (1899–1909) -- L'ombra di Don Giovanni (1910–1914) -- La leggenda di Sakùntala, Tagore and tragedy (1915–1921) -- Turandot (1921–1925) -- Mary Garden—Vienna—Rostand (1926) -- Mussolini and Balzac (1927) -- Metropolitan Opera premiere (1928) -- A tale of two operas (1928–1929) -- France and an American saint (1930–1931) -- Cyrano de Bergerac (1932–1933) -- Palermo and Don Juan de Manara (1934–1941) -- Wartime phoenix (1942–1947) -- Final years (1948–1954) -- Appendix A: Opera plots—Appendix B: The Alfano opus.

External links
 

1875 births
1954 deaths
19th-century classical composers
19th-century Italian male musicians
20th-century classical composers
20th-century Italian composers
20th-century Italian male musicians
Italian ballet composers
Italian classical composers
Italian fascists
Italian male classical composers
Italian opera composers
Italian Romantic composers
Male opera composers
Members of the Royal Academy of Belgium
Musicians from Naples
Pupils of Salomon Jadassohn